KRIV may refer to:

 KRIV (TV), a television station (channel 26) licensed to serve Houston, Texas, United States
 KRIV-FM, a radio station (101.1 FM) licensed to serve Winona, Minnesota, United States
 March Air Reserve Base (ICAO code KRIV)